Ziad Jaziri (born 12 July 1978 in Tunis) is a Tunisian former football striker.

He has 64 caps and 14 goals for the national team, and was called up to the 2006 World Cup. He was also in the 2002 World Cup squad. In addition, Jaziri was on the winning Tunisian team at the 2004 African Cup of Nations. He scored the first goal for Tunisia in the 2006 World Cup against Saudi Arabia on June 14, 2006.

On July 14, 2011, he was arrested with former Tunisian international Hatem Trabelsi and Club Africain player Oussema Sallemi for questioning in a drug possession, consumption and trafficking affair.

International career

International goals
Scores and results list Tunisia's goal tally first.

Honours
Tunisia
 Africa Cup of Nations: 2004

References

External links

 

1978 births
Living people
Footballers from Tunis
Tunisian footballers
Tunisian expatriate footballers
Tunisia international footballers
Association football forwards
2000 African Cup of Nations players
2002 FIFA World Cup players
2004 African Cup of Nations players
2005 FIFA Confederations Cup players
2006 Africa Cup of Nations players
2006 FIFA World Cup players
Étoile Sportive du Sahel players
ES Troyes AC players
Kuwait SC players
Expatriate footballers in Turkey
Gaziantepspor footballers
Expatriate footballers in France
Ligue 1 players
Süper Lig players
Expatriate footballers in Kuwait
Kuwait Premier League players
Tunisian expatriate sportspeople in Kuwait
Tunisian expatriate sportspeople in France
Tunisian expatriate sportspeople in Turkey